The Care of Time (1981) is the last novel by British spy fiction writer Eric Ambler. It deals with the theme of international terrorism, using fictional unpublished memoirs of Russian terrorist Sergey Nechayev as a plot device.

Plot
Robert Halliday is forced by Karlis Zander to help edit the memoirs of a 19th century Russian terrorist Sergey Nechayev, otherwise Zander will detonate a bomb. Halliday soon discovers that Zander and his daughter are themselves threatened by a Middle Eastern terrorist group.

Reception

Kirkus Reviews wrote that the book is "elaborately farfetched" and "doesn't quite triumph by the more conventional criteria for suspense". However, P.D. James wrote "Ambler controls his complicated plot with brilliant expertise".

Writing in 2015, John Gray described the book as "prescient".

Adaptations

The book was adapted for television in 1990, directed by John Davies, with Michael Brandon as Robert Halliday and Christopher Lee as Karlis Zander.

References

External links
Television adaptation'

Novels by Eric Ambler
1981 British novels
British novels adapted into films
Farrar, Straus and Giroux books
Novels about terrorism